The Tralee Ship Canal is a canal built for freight and passenger transportation from Tralee Bay to the town of Tralee in County Kerry, Ireland. The canal fell into disuse in the mid-20th century but has since been restored.

History 
The Tralee Ship Canal was built to accommodate larger ships sailing into Tralee as the quay in Blennerville was becoming unpractical to use due to silting, while merchants in Tralee were not satisfied with its facilities at the start of the 19th century. The House of Commons authorised an Act of Parliament in June 1829 for the canal with work beginning in 1832. Issues with funding meant that the canal was not completed until 1846 when it was opened to ships. Large ships of up to 300 tonnes could navigate the canal but not long after the canal opened it too began to suffer from silting. By the 1880s Fenit harbour was built which was a deep water harbour and did not suffer from silting. A railway was constructed soon afterwards between Fenit and Tralee carrying cargo and freight from ships moored there. Due to silting the canal fell into disuse and neglect, and was closed in 1951.

Restoration 
Following the restoration of Blennerville Windmill in the early 1990s it was envisaged that the canal could be restored as a tourist attraction. In 1999 the Office of Public Works (OPW) started a restoration project of the canal at a cost of IR£650,000. It involved the excavation of the basin, a new swing bridge constructed at Blennerville, the lock gates being restored and the canal being dredged of silt. The basin area of the canal was subsequently redeveloped with apartment blocks built as part of a proposed marina while the towpath along the canal was upgraded and is now used by people as an enjoyable amenity as part of the Dingle Way. Tralee Rowing Club use the canal and have a boathouse at the basin.

References 

Canals in Ireland
Transport in County Kerry
Canals opened in 1846